The Apostolic Prefecture of Southern Patagonia was a short-lived (1884-1916) pre-diocesan Latin Catholic jurisdiction in Patagonia (notably Tierra del Fuego), i.e. southern Chile and Argentina.

History 
 Established in 1884 as Apostolic Prefecture of Southern Patagonia / Patagonia Meridionale (Curiate Italian) / Magallanes / Tierra del Fuego y Islas Malvinas (Spanish) / Magellanen(sis) (Latin adjective) / Patagoniæ Meridionalis (Latin), on territory split off from the Diocese of San Carlos de Ancud
 Suppressed on 1916.10.04, its territory being reassigned partly to the Metropolitan Archdiocese of Buenos Aires (Argentina) and partly to establish the Apostolic Vicariate of Magallanes y Islas Malvinas (now Diocese of Punta Arenas, Chile).

No statistics or incumbent(s) data available.

See also 
 List of Catholic dioceses in Argentina
 List of Catholic dioceses in Chile
 Apostolic Vicariate of Northern Patagonia

Sources and external links 
 GCatholic - data for all sections

Apostolic prefectures
Former Roman Catholic dioceses in America
Suppressed Roman Catholic dioceses